On 7 June 2022, a tunnel collapsed inside a diamond mine near the city of Tshikapa, in the Kasaï Province of the Democratic Republic of the Congo. At least six people were confirmed to have been killed. Local officials stated that the incident took place near the town of Samba, where more than 40 people had been killed, with six bodies uncovered.

References 

2022 in the Democratic Republic of the Congo
2022 disasters in the Democratic Republic of the Congo
Diamond mining
June 2022 events in Africa
Diamond mine collapse
Mining disasters in the Democratic Republic of the Congo
Mining in the Democratic Republic of the Congo